Hae-seong, also spelled Hae-sung, is a Korean masculine given name. Its meaning varies based on the hanja used. There are 23 hanja with the reading "hae" and 27 hanja with the reading "seong" on the South Korean government's official list of hanja which may be used in given names.

People with this name include:
 Jung Hae-seong (born 1958), South Korean football manager
 Song Hae-sung (born 1964), South Korean film director and screenwriter
 Kook Hae-seong (born 1989), South Korean baseball outfielder (KBO League)
 Kwak Hae-seong (born 1991), South Korean football player (K-League Classic)

See also
List of Korean given names

References

Korean masculine given names